Rufus D. Hayes (May 15, 1913 – February 12, 2002) was an attorney, judge, and businessman from Baton Rouge, Louisiana, who served as his state's insurance commissioner from 1957 to 1964. He was also a former district attorney in East Baton Rouge Parish and in 1958 the Louisiana Democratic state chairman. He was a delegate to the 1956 and 1960 Democratic National Conventions held in Chicago, Illinois, and Los Angeles, California, respectively.

Hayes graduated from Southern Baptist-affiliated Louisiana College in Pineville. He received his law degree from Louisiana State University Law Center. During World War II he fought in the Pacific Theater of Operations.

Hayes was appointed insurance commissioner by Governor Earl Kemp Long after Long convinced the legislature to remove the insurance duties from the domain of Secretary of State Wade O. Martin, Jr., with whom Long had quarreled. Hayes won a term of his own in the Democratic runoff election, held on January 9, 1960, having defeated Paul C. Tate (1922–1983) of Mamou in Evangeline Parish, the choice of gubernatorial candidate Bill Dodd. Hayes ran on the Jimmie Davis ticket, all of whose members prevailed in the runoff election. After the elimination of Bill Dodd in the gubernatorial primary, Tate ran on the Morrison intraparty ticket, which was defeated by Davis. Thereafter, Hayes was the only statewide Democratic nominee unopposed in the general election held on April 19, 1960, but none of the Democrats faced a serious threat to election.

In 1963–1964, Hayes did not seek a second elected term as insurance commissioner and was succeeded by Dudley A. Guglielmo, who carried the endorsement of defeated gubernatorial candidates Gillis Long, Shelby M. Jackson, Robert F. Kennon, and Claude Kirkpatrick. Two of the defeated candidates were the outgoing Louisiana State Representative Jack M. Dyer, also of Baton Rouge, who ran on the intraparty ticket of deLesseps Story "Chep" Morrison, Sr., and the departing State Senator Speedy O. Long of La Salle Parish, the choice of John J. McKeithen, the winner of the gubernatorial primary runoff and general election.

In 1985, Hayes sold for $750,000 a  parcel on Highland Road to Jimmy Swaggart Ministries.

Hayes was a judge after his time as insurance commissioner ended. For forty-two years, he was a member of the Hancock Bank board. At the time of his death, Hayes was residing in Baton Rouge in East Baton Rouge Parish. He was living in Oklahoma at the time he acquired his Social Security card.

References

1913 births
2002 deaths
District attorneys in Louisiana
Louisiana Democrats
Louisiana State Democratic Chairmen
Louisiana insurance commissioners
Louisiana state court judges
Louisiana Christian University alumni
Louisiana State University Law Center alumni
Politicians from Baton Rouge, Louisiana
People from East Baton Rouge Parish, Louisiana
American military personnel of World War II
20th-century American judges